Dactylomyza is a genus of trematodes in the family Opecoelidae.

Species
Dactylomyza equesi (Manter, 1947) Aken'Ova, 2003
Dactylomyza gibsoni Aken'Ova, 2003

Species later synonymised with species of Dactylomyza
Dactylomyza equesi (Manter, 1947) Aken'Ova, 2003
Pseudopecoeloides equesi Manter, 1947

References

Opecoelidae
Plagiorchiida genera